Gleason is a masculine given name borne by:

 Gleason Archer Sr. (1880–1966), founder and first president of Suffolk University and Suffolk Law School in Boston, Massachusetts, writer and radio broadcaster
 Gleason Archer Jr. (1916–2004), American biblical scholar, theologian, educator and author, son of the above
 Gleason Belzile (1898–1950), Canadian politician
 Gleason Fournier (born 1991), Canadian ice hockey player

English-language masculine given names